The United States Lighthouse Society is a non-profit organization dedicated to aiding in the restoration of American lighthouses and educating the public about their history. With four chapters, and more than a dozen affiliates, it is one of the largest and oldest lighthouse organizations in the world.

History
Founded in 1984 by Wayne Wheeler and initially headquartered in San Francisco, California, one of the United States Lighthouse Society's first major projects was the purchase of the lightship LV605 in 1986 from a private individual. The organization subsequently invested $400,000 and more than 40,000 volunteer hours in the preservation and restoration of the vessel. In 2003 the society received the California Governor's Historic Preservation Award for its work on the ship.

The society relocated from California to Hansville, Washington in 2008, siting its headquarters at the historic Point No Point Lighthouse, which it rented from Kitsap County (the county, in turn, leased the lighthouse from the U.S. Coast Guard, before ultimately purchasing it in 2012).

In 2009 the U.S. Lighthouse Society was recognized as a "Preserve America Steward," one of the first 11 cultural and historic organizations designated to receive the Bureau of Land Management-sponsored award in recognition of "a successful use of volunteer time and commitment." The society launched a partnership with clothing brand Lands' End in 2014. Under the terms of the deal, Lands' End made a donation of $30,000 to support restoration of the Block Island Southeast Lighthouse in Block Island, Rhode Island.

Activities

Preservation
The society actively raises money and organizes volunteers to preserve and restore four historic lighthouses: the Point No Point Lighthouse in Washington state, Hooper Island Lighthouse in Maryland, Thomas Point Shoal Lighthouse in Maryland, and Lightship LV605, currently moored in Oakland, California.

Publications
The society publishes a quarterly print magazine, The Keepers' Log, about the history of lighthouses in the United States. A second quarterly publication, Lighthouse Bulletin, chronicles society activities and is distributed in PDF format via email.

Travel
The United States Lighthouse Society organizes several one-to-two-week tours of historic lighthouses during the spring and early autumn for members and non-members. In 2014 tours were scheduled in eastern Michigan, Massachusetts, Maine, the Outer Banks, Long Island, and along the St. Lawrence River.

References

Historic preservation organizations in the United States
Lighthouses in the United States
1984 establishments in California
Organizations established in 1984
Lighthouse organizations